Adolf Hagn is an Austrian para-alpine skier. He represented Austria in alpine skiing at the 1976 Winter Paralympics.

Career 

He won the gold medal at the Men's Giant Slalom IV B event at the 1976 Winter Paralympics. He also won the silver medal at the Men's Alpine Combination IV B event. His win at the Alpine Combination IV B event formed part of a medal sweep as Horst Morokutti and Willi Berger, both representing Austria as well, won the gold and bronze medals respectively.

Achievements

See also 

 List of Paralympic medalists in alpine skiing

References

External links 
 

Living people
Year of birth missing (living people)
Place of birth missing (living people)
Paralympic alpine skiers of Austria
Alpine skiers at the 1976 Winter Paralympics
Medalists at the 1976 Winter Paralympics
Paralympic gold medalists for Austria
Paralympic silver medalists for Austria
Paralympic medalists in alpine skiing
20th-century Austrian people